Pača    is a village and municipality in the Rožňava District in the Košice Region of middle-eastern Slovakia.

History
In historical records the village was first mentioned in 1338.

Geography
The village lies at an altitude of 428 metres and covers an area of 25.579 km².
It has a population of about 640 people.

Culture
The village has a public library and a football pitch.

External links
Official site

Villages and municipalities in Rožňava District